Jeffery J. Hayward (born April 3, 1960 in Lynn, Massachusetts) is an American politician who represented the 10th Essex district in the Massachusetts House of Representatives from 1991–1995. He was a candidate for the United States House of Representatives seat in Massachusetts's 6th congressional district in 1994, but lost in the Democratic primary to John F. Tierney by 538 votes.

From 1986–1991 he was the Chief of Staff to Lynn Mayor Albert V. DiVirgilio.

References

1960 births
Democratic Party members of the Massachusetts House of Representatives
Politicians from Lynn, Massachusetts
Saint Anselm College alumni
Living people